Dango Aboubacar Faissal Ouattara (born 11 February 2002) is a Burkinabè professional footballer who plays as a forward for Premier League club AFC Bournemouth and the Burkina Faso national team.

Club career

Lorient
A youth product of the Burkinabè club Majestic FC, Ouattara joined the reserves of Lorient in 2020. He signed his first professional contract with the club on 20 May 2021. He made his professional debut with Lorient in a 1–1 Ligue 1 tie with Saint-Étienne 8 August 2021.

AFC Bournemouth
On 19 January 2023, Premier League club AFC Bournemouth announced the signing of Ouattara on a contract until 2028.

International career 
Ouattara made his professional debut with the Burkina Faso national team in a 0–0 friendly tie with Mauritania on 30 December 2021. He scored his first goal for Burkina Faso in their 2021 Africa Cup of Nations quarter-final win against Tunisia.

Career statistics

Club

International goals

References

External links
Profile at the AFC Bournemouth website

2002 births
Living people
Sportspeople from Ouagadougou
Burkinabé footballers
Association football forwards
FC Lorient players
AFC Bournemouth players
Burkinabé Premier League players
Championnat National 2 players
Ligue 1 players
Premier League players
Burkinabé expatriate footballers
Expatriate footballers in England
Expatriate footballers in France
Burkinabé expatriate sportspeople in England
Burkinabé expatriate sportspeople in France
Burkina Faso international footballers
2021 Africa Cup of Nations players
21st-century Burkinabé people